The 1988 Paris–Tours was the 82nd edition of the Paris–Tours cycle race and was held on 9 October 1988. The race started in Chaville and finished in Tours. The race was won by Peter Pieters of the TVM team.

General classification

References

1988 in French sport
1988